Digi TV may refer to

Digi TV, a Romanian TV service of Digi Communications
DigiTV, TV hardware by Nebula Electronics
Digi-TV, an American over the air television network